The following article presents a summary of the 1971 football (soccer) season in Brazil, which was the 70th season of competitive football in the country.

Campeonato Brasileiro Série A

Final Stage

Atlético Mineiro declared as the Campeonato Brasileiro champions.

Campeonato Brasileiro Série B

Semifinals

North-Northeastern Zone

|}

Central-Southern Zone

Final

Villa Nova declared as the Campeonato Brasileiro Série B champions by aggregate score of 4–2.

Promotion
No club was promoted to the following year's first level.

State championship champions

Youth competition champions

Other competition champions

Brazilian clubs in international competitions

Brazil national team
The following table lists all the games played by the Brazil national football team in official competitions and friendly matches during 1971.

References

 Brazilian competitions at RSSSF
 1971 Brazil national team matches at RSSSF

 
Seasons in Brazilian football
Brazil